The 1994 Newsweek Champions Cup and the Evert Cup were tennis tournaments played on outdoor hard courts. It was the 21st edition of the Indian Wells Masters and was part of the Super 9 of the 1994 ATP Tour and of Tier II of the 1994 WTA Tour. They were held at the Grand Champions Resort in Indian Wells, California, in the United States, with the women's tournament played from February 21 through February 27, 1994, while the men's tournament was played from February 28 through March 7, 1994.

The men singles was headlined by World No. 1 Pete Sampras, Jim Courier and Stefan Edberg. Other top seeds were Sergi Bruguera, Goran Ivanišević, Michael Chang, Todd Martin and Thomas Muster.

The women's draw featured World No. 1 Steffi Graf, Mary Joe Fernández, and Lindsay Davenport. Other top seeds present were Natasha Zvereva, Helena Suková, and Amanda Coetzer.

Finals

Men's singles

 Pete Sampras defeated  Petr Korda 4–6, 6–3, 3–6, 6–3, 6–2
 It was Sampras' 3rd title of the year and the 25th of his career. It was his 1st Masters title of the year and his 3rd overall.

Women's singles

 Steffi Graf defeated  Amanda Coetzer 6–0, 6–4
 It was Graf's 3rd title of the year and the 93rd of her career.

Men's doubles

 Grant Connell /  Patrick Galbraith defeated  Byron Black /  Jonathan Stark 7–5, 6–3
 It was Connell's 1st title of the year and the 8th of his career. It was Galbraith's 1st title of the year and the 16th of his career.

Women's doubles

 Lindsay Davenport /  Lisa Raymond defeated  Manon Bollegraf /  Helena Suková 6–2, 6–4
 It was Davenport's 2nd title of the year and the 3rd of her career. It was Raymond's only title of the year and the 2nd of her career.

References

External links
 
 Association of Tennis Professionals (ATP) tournament profile
 WTA tournament profile

Newsweek Champions Cup
Evert Cup
Indian Wells Masters
Newsweek Champions Cup and the Evert Cup
Newsweek Champions Cup and the Evert Cup
Newsweek Champions Cup and the Evert Cup
Newsweek Champions Cup and the Evert Cup